Jawed Karim (Bengali: জাভেদ করিম; born October 28, 1979) is an American software engineer and Internet entrepreneur of Bangladeshi and German descent. He is a co-founder of YouTube and the first person to upload a video to the site. This inaugural video, titled "Me at the zoo" and uploaded on April 23, 2005, has been viewed over 260 million times, . During Karim's time working at PayPal, where he met the fellow YouTube co-founders Steven Chen and Chad Hurley, he had designed many of the core components including its real-time anti-Internet-fraud system.

Early life 
Jawed Karim was born on October 28, 1979, in Merseburg, East Germany, to a Bangladeshi father and a German mother. His father Naimul Karim is a Muslim Bangladeshi who works as a researcher at 3M, and his mother, Christine, is a German scientist of biochemistry at the University of Minnesota. He was the elder of two boys. He crossed the inner German border with his family in the early 1980s because of xenophobia, growing up in Neuss, West Germany. Experiencing xenophobia there as well, Karim moved with his family to Saint Paul, Minnesota, in 1992. He graduated from Saint Paul Central High School in 1997, and attended the University of Illinois at Urbana-Champaign. He left campus prior to graduating to become an early employee at PayPal; however, he continued his coursework, earning his bachelor's degree in computer science. He subsequently earned a master's degree in computer science from Stanford University. In addition to English, Jawed speaks German and Bengali.

Career 

In university, Karim served an Internship at Silicon Graphics, Inc., where he worked on 3D voxel data management for very large data sets for volume rendering, including the data for the Visible Human Project. While working at PayPal in 2002, he met Chad Hurley and Steve Chen. Three years later, in 2005, they founded the video-sharing website YouTube. Karim created the first channel on YouTube, "jawed", on April 23, 2005 PDT (April 24, 2005 UTC), and uploaded the website's first video, "Me at the zoo", the same day.

After co-founding the company and developing the YouTube concept and website with Chad Hurley and Steve Chen, Karim enrolled as a graduate student in computer science at Stanford University while acting as an adviser to YouTube. When the site was introduced in February 2005, Karim agreed not to be an employee and simply be an informal adviser, and that he was focusing on his studies. As a result, he took a much lower share in the company compared to Hurley and Chen. Because of his smaller role in the company, Karim was mostly unknown to the public as the third founder until YouTube was acquired by Google in 2006. Despite his lower share in the company, the purchase was still large enough that he received 137,443 shares of stock, worth about $64 million based on Google's closing stock price at the time.

In October 2006, Karim gave a lecture about the history of YouTube at the University of Illinois annual ACM Conference entitled YouTube From Concept to Hyper growth. Karim returned again to the University of Illinois in May 2008 as the 136th and youngest commencement speaker in the school's history.

Investments 
In March 2008, Karim launched a venture fund called Youniversity Ventures (now known as YVentures) with partners Keith Rabois and Kevin Hartz. Karim is one of Airbnb's first investors, investing in the company's initial seed round in April 2009. Y Ventures has also invested in Palantir, Reddit and Eventbrite.

Responses to YouTube 
Occasionally Karim has updated the video description of "Me at the zoo" to criticize decisions made by YouTube.

On November 6, 2013, YouTube began requiring that commenting on its videos be done via a Google+ account, a move that was widely opposed by the YouTube community. An online petition to revert the change garnered over 240,000 signatures.

In response to Google requiring YouTube members to use Google+ for its comment system, Karim wrote on his YouTube account, "why the fuck do i need a Google+ account to comment on a video?", and updated the video description on his first video titled "Me at the zoo" to "I can't comment here anymore, since i don't want a Google+ account".

In response to pressure from the YouTube community, Google publicly apologized for forcing Google+ users to use their real names, which was one of the reasons the Google+ integration was unpopular with YouTube users. Google subsequently dropped its Google+ requirement across all products, beginning with YouTube. Google announced in October 2018 its intention to permanently shut down Google+, as it had failed to achieve broad consumer or developer adoption, and because of a vulnerability. Google+ was closed for personal accounts on April 2, 2019.

In November 2021, Jawed updated the description of "Me at the zoo" to include "When every YouTuber agrees that removing dislikes is a stupid idea, it probably is. Try again, YouTube🤦‍♂️". A few days later, Karim updated the description again to a more detailed condemnation of YouTube's decision. The description was later removed, and as of January 2023 the video's description is blank.

See also 
 PayPal Mafia
 History of YouTube

Notes

References

External links 

 Jawed Karim's Personal Website
 Jawed Karim's YouTube Profile
 Cache of Jawed Karim's YouTube Profile in 2008
 Youniversity Ventures
"He went off to college to make his fortune" – The News-Gazette (October 16, 2006)

1979 births
21st-century American businesspeople
21st-century American scientists
21st-century German businesspeople
21st-century German scientists
American computer businesspeople
American computer programmers
American computer scientists
American Muslims
American people of Bangladeshi descent
American people of German descent
American technology chief executives
American technology company founders
American YouTubers
Businesspeople from Saint Paul, Minnesota
East German emigrants to the United States
East German emigrants to West Germany
East German scientists
German computer programmers
German computer scientists
German emigrants to the United States
German people of Bangladeshi descent
German YouTubers
Internet pioneers
Living people
YouTube
YouTube channels launched in 2005
PayPal people
People from Merseburg
People with acquired American citizenship
Grainger College of Engineering alumni
West German emigrants
20th-century Bengalis
21st-century Bengalis